The Douglas A-1 Skyraider (formerly known as the AD Skyraider) is an American single-seat attack aircraft in service from 1946 to the early 1980s, which served during the Korean War and Vietnam War. The Skyraider had an unusually long career, remaining in front-line service well into the Jet Age (when most piston-engine attack or fighter aircraft were replaced by Jet aircraft); thus becoming known by some as an "anachronism". The aircraft was nicknamed "Spad", after the French World War I fighter.

It was operated by the United States Navy (USN), the United States Marine Corps (USMC), and the United States Air Force (USAF), and also saw service with the British Royal Navy, the French Air Force, the Republic of Vietnam Air Force (RVNAF), and others. It remained in U.S. service until the early 1970s.

The jet powered A-10 Thunderbolt II was based on specifications for a modernized Skyraider with a heavy payload and good endurance.

Design and development
The piston-engined, propeller-driven Skyraider was designed during World War II to meet United States Navy requirements for a carrier-based, single-seat, long-range, high performance dive/torpedo bomber, to follow on from earlier aircraft such as the Douglas SBD Dauntless, the Curtiss SB2C Helldiver and the Grumman TBF Avenger. Designed by Ed Heinemann of the Douglas Aircraft Company, prototypes were ordered on 6 July 1944 as the XBT2D-1. The XBT2D-1 made its first flight on 18 March 1945, and the USN began evaluation of the aircraft at the Naval Air Test Center (NATC) in April 1945. In December 1946, after a designation change to AD-1, delivery of the first production aircraft to a fleet squadron was made to VA-19A.

The AD-1 was built at Douglas's El Segundo plant in Southern California. In his memoir The Lonely Sky, test pilot Bill Bridgeman described the routine yet sometimes hazardous work of certifying AD-1s fresh off the assembly line at a rate of two aircraft per day for delivery to the U.S. Navy in 1949 and 1950.

The low-wing monoplane design started with a Wright R-3350 Duplex-Cyclone radial engine which was later upgraded several times. The aircraft had distinctive large straight wings with seven hardpoints apiece. The Skyraider had excellent maneuverability at low speed, and carried a large amount of ordnance over a considerable combat radius. It had a long loiter time for its size, compared to much heavier subsonic or supersonic jets. The aircraft was optimized for ground attack and was armored against ground fire in key locations, unlike faster fighters adapted to carry bombs, such as the Vought F4U Corsair or North American P-51 Mustang, which were retired by U.S. forces before the 1960s.

Heinemann immediately had his design engineers begin a program for finding weight savings on the XBT2D-1 design, no matter how small.

The Navy AD series was initially painted in ANA 623 glossy sea blue, but during the 1950s, following the Korean War, the color scheme was changed to light gull grey and white (Fed Std 595 27875). Initially using the gray and white Navy scheme, by 1967 the USAF began to paint its Skyraiders in a camouflaged pattern using two shades of green, and one of tan.

Used by the US Navy over Korea and Vietnam, the A-1 was a primary close air support aircraft for the USAF and RVNAF during the Vietnam War. The A-1 was famous for being able to take hits and keep flying thanks to armor plating around the cockpit area for pilot protection. It was replaced beginning in the mid-1960s by the Grumman A-6 Intruder as the Navy's primary medium-attack plane in supercarrier-based air wings; however Skyraiders continued to operate from the smaller Essex-class aircraft carriers.

The Skyraider went through seven versions, starting with the AD-1, then AD-2 and AD-3 with various minor improvements, then the AD-4 with a more powerful R-3350-26WA engine. The AD-5 was significantly widened, allowing two crew to sit side-by-side (this was not the first multiple-crew variant, the AD-1Q being a two-seater and the AD-3N a three-seater); it also came in a four-seat night-attack version, the AD-5N. The AD-6 was an improved AD-4B with improved low-level bombing equipment, and the final production version AD-7 was upgraded to an R-3350-26WB engine.

For service in Vietnam, USAF Skyraiders were fitted with the Stanley Yankee extraction system, which acted in a similar manner to an ejection seat, though with twin rockets extracting the pilot from the cockpit.

In addition to serving during Korea and Vietnam as an attack aircraft, the Skyraider was modified to serve as a carrier-based airborne early warning aircraft, replacing the Grumman TBM-3W Avenger. It fulfilled this function in the USN and Royal Navy, being replaced by the Grumman E-1 Tracer and Fairey Gannet, respectively, in those services.

Skyraider production ended in 1957 with a total of 3,180 having been built. In 1962, the existing Skyraiders were redesignated A-1D through A-1J and later used by both the USAF and the Navy in the Vietnam War.

Operational history

Korean War

Its weapons load and 10-hour flying time far surpassed the jets that were available at the time. On 2 May 1951, Skyraiders made the only aerial torpedo attack of the war, hitting the Hwacheon Dam, then controlled by North Korea.

On 16 June 1953, a USMC AD-4 from VMC-1 piloted by Major George H. Linnemeier and CWO Vernon S. Kramer shot down a Soviet-built Polikarpov Po-2 biplane, the only documented Skyraider air victory of the war. AD-3N and -4N aircraft carrying bombs and flares, flew night-attack sorties, and radar-equipped ADs carried out radar-jamming missions from carriers and land bases.

During the Korean War, AD Skyraiders were flown by only the U.S. Navy and U.S. Marine Corps, and were normally painted in dark navy blue. It was called the "Blue Plane" by enemy troops. Marine Corps Skyraiders suffered heavy losses when used in low-level close-support missions. A total of 128 Navy and Marine AD Skyraiders were lost in the Korean War – 101 in combat and 27 to operational causes. Most operational losses were due to the tremendous power of the AD: ADs that were "waved-off" during carrier recovery operations were prone to performing a fatal torque roll into the sea or the deck of the aircraft carrier if the pilot mistakenly gave the AD too much throttle. The torque of the engine was so great that it would cause the aircraft to rotate about the propeller and slam into the sea or the carrier.

Cathay Pacific VR-HEU incident
On 26 July 1954, two Douglas Skyraiders from the aircraft carriers  and  shot down two Chinese PLAAF Lavochkin fighters off the coast of Hainan Island while searching for survivors after the shooting down of a Cathay Pacific Douglas DC-4 Skymaster airliner three days previously.

Vietnam War

As American involvement in the Vietnam War began, the A-1 Skyraider was still the medium attack aircraft in many carrier air wings, although it was planned to be replaced by the A-6A Intruder as part of the general switch to jet aircraft.

Shoot-downs
During the war, U.S. Navy Skyraiders used their cannon to shoot down two Vietnam People's Air Force (VPAF) Mikoyan-Gurevich MiG-17 jet fighters. The first, on 20 June 1965 by Lieutenant Clinton B. Johnson and LTJG Charles W. Hartman III of VA-25, was the first gun kill of the Vietnam War. The other was on 9 October 1966 by LTJG William T. Patton of VA-176.

Tactical operators
As they were released from U.S. Navy service, Skyraiders were introduced into the Republic of Vietnam Air Force (RVNAF). Skyraiders were also used by the U.S. Air Force, specifically Special Operations elements of the Tactical Air Command, for search and rescue air cover. They were also used by the USAF to perform one of the Skyraider's most famous roles — the "Sandy" helicopter escort on combat rescues. On 10 March 1966, USAF Major Bernard F. Fisher flew an A-1E mission and was awarded the Medal of Honor for rescuing Major "Jump" Myers at A Shau Special Forces Camp. USAF Colonel William A. Jones III piloted an A-1H on 1 September 1968 mission for which he was awarded the Medal of Honor. In that mission, despite damage to his aircraft and suffering serious burns, he returned to his base and reported the position of a downed U.S. airman.

After November 1972, all A-1s in U.S. service in Southeast Asia were transferred to the RVNAF. The Skyraider in Vietnam pioneered the concept of tough, survivable aircraft with long loiter times and large ordnance loads. The USAF lost 201 Skyraiders to all causes in Southeast Asia, while the Navy lost 65 to all causes. Of the 266 lost A-1s, five were shot down by Surface-to-Air Missiles (SAMs), and three were shot down in air-to-air combat; two by VPAF MiG-17s.

Losses
On 5 August 1964, the first A-1E Skyraider was shot down during Operation Pierce Arrow. The pilot, Lt. (jg) Richard Sather, was the first Navy pilot killed in the war. On the night of 29 August 1964, the second A-1E Skyraider was shot down and the pilot killed near Bien Hoa Air Base; it was flown by Capt. Richard D. Goss from the 1st Air Commando Squadron, 34th Tactical Group. He was reported missing, presumed dead.

While on his first mission, Navy pilot Lt. (jg) Dieter Dengler took damage to his A-1H over Vietnam on 1 February 1966, and crash-landed in Laos. Col. Oscar Mauterer ejected from his A-1 after taking heavy enemy fire while providing cover for a damaged friendly aircraft on February 15, 1966. Radio reports confirmed Mauterer had a good chute, but was captured by enemy forces. Mauterer is still POW/MIA status.
The next A-1 was shot down on 29 April 1966, and Pilot Capt. Grant N. Tabor, was lost on 19 April 1967; both were from the 602 Air Commando Squadron. Joseph P. Dunn, USN flew too close to the Chinese island of Hainan and was intercepted. Lieutenant Dunn's A-1H Skyraider 134499 (Canasta 404) was the last Navy A-1 lost in the war. He was observed to survive the ejection and deploy his raft, but was never found. Initially listed as missing in action, he is now listed as killed in action and posthumously promoted to the rank of Commander. Shortly thereafter, A-1 Skyraider naval squadrons transitioned to the A-6 Intruder, A-7 Corsair II or Douglas A-4 Skyhawk.

The U.S. Air Force used the naval A-1 Skyraider for the first time in Vietnam. As the Vietnam War progressed, USAF A-1s were painted in camouflage, while USN A-1 Skyraiders were gray/white in color in contrast to the Korean War, when A-1s were painted dark blue.

In October 1965, to highlight the dropping of the six millionth pound of ordnance, Commander Clarence J. Stoddard of VA-25, flying an A-1H, dropped a special, one-time-only object in addition to his other munitions – a toilet.

Republic of Vietnam Air Force

The A-1 Skyraider was the close air support workhorse of the RVNAF for much of the Vietnam War. The U.S. Navy began to transfer some of its Skyraiders to the RVNAF in September 1960, replacing the RVNAF's older Grumman F8F Bearcats. By 1962 the RVNAF had 22 of the aircraft in its inventory, and by 1968 an additional 131 aircraft had been received. Initially Navy aviators and crews were responsible for training their South Vietnamese counterparts on the aircraft, but over time responsibility was gradually transferred to the USAF.

The initial trainees were selected from among RVNAF Bearcat pilots who had accumulated 800 to 1200 hours flying time. They were trained at NAS Corpus Christi, Texas, and then sent to NAS Lemoore, California for further training. Navy pilots and crews in Vietnam checked out the Skyraiders that were being transferred to the RVNAF, and conducted courses for RVNAF ground crews.

Over the course of the war, the RVNAF acquired a total of 308 Skyraiders, and was operating six A-1 squadrons by the end of 1965. These were reduced during the period of Vietnamization from 1968 to 1972, as the U.S. began to supply the South Vietnamese with more modern close air support aircraft, such as the A-37 Dragonfly and Northrop F-5, and at the beginning of 1968, only three of its squadrons were flying A-1s.

As the U.S. ended its direct involvement in the war, it transferred the remainder of its Skyraiders to the South Vietnamese, and by 1973, all remaining Skyraiders in U.S. inventories had been turned over to the RVNAF.  Unlike their American counterparts, whose combat tours were generally limited to 12 months, individual South Vietnamese Skyraider pilots ran up many thousands of combat hours in the A-1, and many senior RVNAF pilots were extremely skilled in the operation of the aircraft.

United Kingdom

The Royal Navy acquired 50 AD-4W early warning aircraft in 1951 through the Military Assistance Program. All Skyraider AEW.1s were operated by 849 Naval Air Squadron, which provided four-plane detachments for the British carriers.

In 1960, the Fairey Gannet AEW.3 replaced the Skyraiders, using the AN/APS-20 radar of the Douglas aircraft. The last British Skyraiders were retired in 1962. In the late 1960s, the AN/APS-20 radars from the Skyraiders were installed in Avro Shackleton AEW.2s of the Royal Air Force which were finally retired in 1991.

Sweden
Fourteen ex-British AEW.1 Skyraiders were sold to Sweden to be used by Svensk Flygtjänst AB between 1962 and 1976. All military equipment was removed and the aircraft were used as target tugs supporting the Swedish Armed Forces.

France
The French Air Force bought 20 ex-USN AD-4s as well as 88 ex-USN AD-4Ns and five ex-USN AD-4NAs with the former three-seaters modified as single-seat aircraft with removal of the radar equipment and the two operator stations from the rear fuselage. The AD-4N/NAs were initially acquired in 1956 to replace aging Republic P-47 Thunderbolts in Algeria.

The Skyraiders were first ordered in 1956 and the first was handed over to the French Air Force on 6 February 1958 after being overhauled and fitted with some French equipment by Sud-Aviation. The aircraft were used until the end of the Algerian war. The aircraft were used by the 20e Escadre de Chasse (EC 1/20 "Aures Nementcha", EC 2/20 "Ouarsenis" and EC 3/20 "Oranie") and EC 21 in the close air support role armed with rockets, bombs and napalm.

The Skyraiders had only a short career in Algeria, but they nonetheless proved to be the most successful of all the ad hoc counter-insurgency aircraft deployed by the French. The Skyraider remained in limited French service until the 1970s. They were heavily involved in the civil war in Chad, at first with the Armée de l'Air, and later with a nominally independent Chadian Air Force staffed by French mercenaries. The aircraft also operated under the French flag in Djibouti and on the island of Madagascar. When France at last relinquished the Skyraiders it passed the survivors on to allied states, including Gabon, Chad, Cambodia and the Central African Republic. (Several aircraft from Gabon and Chad were recovered by French warbird enthusiasts and entered on the French civil register.)

The French frequently used the aft station to carry maintenance personnel, spare parts and supplies to forward bases. In Chad they even used the aft station for a "bombardier" and his "special stores" – empty beer bottles – as these were considered as non-lethal weapons, thus not breaking the government-imposed rules of engagement, during operations against Libyan-supported rebels in the late 1960s and early 1970s.

Variants

XBT2D-1 Single-seat dive-bomber, torpedo-bomber prototype for the U.S. Navy
XBT2D-1N Three-seat night attack prototypes; only three aircraft built
XBT2D-1P Photographic reconnaissance prototype; only one built
XBT2D-1Q Two-seat electronics countermeasures prototype; one aircraft only
BT2D-2 (XAD-2) Upgraded attack aircraft; one prototype only
AD-1 The first production model; 242 built
AD-1Q Two-seat electronic countermeasures version of the AD-1; 35 built
AD-1U AD-1 with radar countermeasures and tow target equipment, no armament and no water injection equipment
XAD-1W Three-seat airborne early warning prototype. AD-3W prototype; one aircraft only.
AD-2 Improved model, powered by  Wright R-3350-26W engine; 156 built
AD-2D Unofficial designation for AD-2s used as remote-control aircraft, to collect and gather radioactive material in the air after nuclear tests
AD-2Q Two-seat electronics countermeasures version of the AD-2; 21 built
AD-2QU AD-2 with radar countermeasures and target towing equipment, no armament and no water injection equipment; one aircraft only
XAD-2 Similar to XBT2D-1 except engine, increased fuel capacity
AD-3 Proposed turboprop version, initial designation of A2D Skyshark
AD-3 Stronger fuselage, improved landing gear, new canopy design; 125 built
AD-3S Anti-submarine warfare model; only two prototypes were built
AD-3N Three-seat night attack version; 15 built
AD-3Q Electronics countermeasures version, countermeasures equipment relocated for better crew comfort; 23 built
AD-3QU Target towing aircraft, but most were delivered as AD-3Qs
AD-3W Airborne early warning version; 31 built
XAD-3E AD-3W modified for ASW with Aeroproducts propeller
AD-4 Strengthened landing gear, improved radar, G-2 compass, anti-G suit provisions, four  cannon and 14 Aero rocket launchers; 372 built
AD-4B Specialized version designed to carry nuclear weapons, also armed with four  cannon; 165 built plus 28 conversions
AD-4L Equipped for winter operations in Korea; 63 conversions
AD-4N (A-1D) Three-seat night attack version; 307 built
AD-4NA Designation of 100 AD-4Ns without their night-attack equipment, but fitted with four 20 mm cannon, for service in Korea as ground-attack aircraft
AD-4NL Winterized version of the AD-4N; 36 conversions
AD-4Q Two-seat electronic countermeasures version of the AD-4; 39 built
AD-4W Three-seat airborne early warning version; 168 built. A total of 50 AD-4Ws were transferred to the Royal Navy as Skyraider AEW Mk 1s.
AD-5 (A-1E) Side-by-side seating for pilot and co-pilot, without dive brakes; 212 built
AD-5N (A-1G) Four-seat night attack version, with radar countermeasures; 239 built
AD-5Q (EA-1F) Four-seat electronics countermeasures version; 54 conversions
AD-5S One prototype to test magnetic anomaly detector (MAD) anti-submarine equipment
AD-5U The AD-5 when modified for target towing became the UA-1E in 1962. The same model converted as a transport was sometimes referred to as the AD-5R.
AD-5W (EA-1E) Three-seat airborne early warning version with an AN/APS-20 radar installed; 218 were built
UA-1E Utility version of the AD-5
AD-7 (A-1J) The final production model, powered by a R-3350-26WB engine, with structural improvements to increase wing fatigue life; 72 built

Operators

Surviving aircraft

Specifications (AD-6 / A-1H Skyraider)

Naming
The A-1 Skyraider received various nicknames including: "Spad" and "Super Spad" (derived from the aircraft's AD designation, its relative longevity in service and an allusion to the "Spad" aircraft of World War I), "Able Dog" (phonetic AD), "the Destroyer", "Hobo" (radio call sign of the US Air Force's 1st Air Commando/1st Special Operations Squadron), "Firefly" (a call sign of the 602nd ACS/SOS), "Zorro" (the call sign of the 22nd SOS), "The Big Gun", "Old Faithful", "Old Miscellaneous", "Fat Face" (AD-5/A-1E version, side-by-side seating), "Guppy" (AD-5W version), "Q-Bird" or "Queer Bird" (AD-1Q/AD-5Q versions), "Flying Dumptruck" (A-1E), "Sandy" (the 602nd ACS/SOS call sign for Combat Search And Rescue helicopter escort), and "Crazy Water Buffalo" (South Vietnamese nickname).

Notable appearances in media

See also

References

Notes

Bibliography
 Andrade, John M. U.S. Military Aircraft Designations and Serials since 1909. Midland Counties Publications, 1979. .
 Ballance Theo with Lee Howard and Ray Sturtivant. The Squadrons and Units of the Fleet Air Arm. Staplefield, England:Air-Britain, 2016. .
 Burgess, Richard R. and Rosario M. Rausa. US Navy A-1 Skyraider Units of the Vietnam War (Osprey Combat Aircraft #77). Oxford, UK: Osprey Publishing Limited, 2009. .
 Bridgeman, William and Jacqueline Hazard. The Lonely Sky. New York: Henry Holt & Co., 1955. .
 Chinnery, Philip D. Air Commando: Inside The Air Force Special Operations Command. London: St. Martin's Paperbacks, 1997. .
 Denehan, William, Major, USAF. From Crickets To Dragonflies: Training And Equipping The Republic of Vietnam Air Force 1955-1972. Maxwell Air Force Base, Alabama: Air Command and Staff College, Air University, 1997.
 Dengler, Dieter. Escape from Laos. New York: Presidio Press, 1979. .
 Dorr, Robert F. "Southeast Asian "Spad" ... The Skyraider's War". Air Enthusiast, Thirty-six, May–August 1988. Bromley, UK:FineScroll. pp. 1–11, 73–77. .
 Dorr, Robert F. and Chris Bishop. Vietnam Air War Debrief. London: Aerospace Publishing, 1996. .
 Drury, Richard S. My Secret War. Fallbrook, California: Aero Publishing Inc., 1979. .
 Faltum, Andrew. The Essex Aircraft Carriers. Baltimore, Maryland: The Nautical & Aviation Publishing Company of America, 1996. .
 Francillon, René J. McDonnell Douglas Aircraft since 1920. London: Putnam, 1979. .
 Grossnick, Roy A. and William J. Armstrong. United States Naval Aviation, 1910–1995. Annapolis, Maryland: Naval Historical Center, 1997. .
 Hobson, Chris. Vietnam Air Losses, USAF/USN/USMC, Fixed-Wing Aircraft Losses in Southeast Asia, 1961-1973. North Branch, Minnesota: Specialty Press, 2001. .
 Johnson E.R. American Attack Aircraft since 1926. Jefferson, North Carolina: McFarland & Company, Inc., Publishers. 2008. .
 McCarthy, Donald J. Jr. MiG Killers: A Chronology of US Air Victories in Vietnam 1965–1973. North Branch, Minnesota: Specialty Press, 2009. .
 Mersky, Peter B. U.S. Marine Corps Aviation: 1912 to the Present. Annapolis, Maryland: The Nautical and Aviation Publishing Company of America, 1983. .

 "Skyraider". Model Airplane News, September 2008, Volume 136, Number 9; Cover and p. 38.
 Smith, Peter C., Douglas AD Skyraider – Crowood Aviation Series. Marlborough Great Britain: Crowood Press, 1999, .
 Swanborough, Gordon and Peter M. Bowers. United States Navy Aircraft since 1911. London: Putnam, Second edition 1976. .
 United States Air Force Museum Guidebook. Wright-Patterson AFB Ohio: Air Force Museum Association, 1975.

External links

 Skyraider.org
 Air Force Fact sheet on the Douglas A-1E Skyraider flown by Major Fisher
 
 The A-1 in Airpower Classics from Air Force Magazine
 Douglas A-1 Skyraider articles and publications
 AeroWeb: List of A-1 survivors on display
 Heritage Flight Museum: A-1 Skyraider “The Proud American”
 
"AD-5 Skyraider: Dipping into the Horsepower Pool" (pilot report), Budd Davisson, 1999, Flight Journal

Carrier-based aircraft
1940s United States attack aircraft
A-01 Skyraider
Single-engined tractor aircraft
Low-wing aircraft
Aircraft first flown in 1945